Conocephalus is a genus of bush crickets, known as coneheads (a term also sometimes applied to members of the related genus Ruspolia). It was described by Carl Peter Thunberg in 1815.

Description 
Conocephalus range from 10 to 27 mm in length, measured from head to wingtip. They can be distinguished from the related genus Orchelimum by being smaller and slimmer in general, the face usually being green and the ovipositors of females usually being straight.

The forewings vary in length. Some species always have short forewings, some usually have short forewings but occasionally have individuals with forewings longer than the abdomen, and some always have long forewings.

Species can be distinguished by the shapes of the cerci (males) and ovipositor (females).

Ecology 
Bush crickets of this genus live in fields and meadows, where they feed on leaves, flowers, pollen and seeds of grasses and forbs. They also sometimes prey on other insects. Females lay their eggs in grass stems.

Subgenera and species
The Orthoptera Species File lists the following species, grouped into subgenera:

Conocephalus (Amurocephalus)  
- subgenus: Storozhenko, 2004 (China)
 Conocephalus chinensis (Redtenbacher, 1891)

Conocephalus (Anisoptera)  
- subgenus: Latreille, 1829 (Worldwide) - synonym Xiphidium Burmeister, 1838

 Conocephalus aberrans (Redtenbacher, 1891)
 Conocephalus adustus (Redtenbacher, 1891)
 Conocephalus aigialus Rehn & Hebard, 1915
 Conocephalus algerinorum Massa, 1999
 Conocephalus angustifrons (Redtenbacher, 1891)
 Conocephalus angustivertex Pitkin, 1980
 Conocephalus armatipes (Karsch, 1893)
 Conocephalus attenuatus (Scudder, 1869)
 Conocephalus bakeri (Karny, 1920)
 Conocephalus bechuanensis (Péringuey, 1916)
 Conocephalus beybienkoi Storozhenko, 1981
 Conocephalus bidentatus Shi & Zheng, 1994
 Conocephalus bilineatus (Erichson, 1842)
 Conocephalus bivittatus (Bolívar, 1900)
 Conocephalus borellii (Giglio-Tos, 1897)
 Conocephalus borneensis (Redtenbacher, 1891)
 Conocephalus brevicercus (Karsch, 1893)
 Conocephalus brevipennis (Scudder, 1862)
 Conocephalus caudalis (Walker, 1869)
 Conocephalus chavesi (Bolívar, 1905)
 Conocephalus cinereus Thunberg, 1815
 Conocephalus cognatus (Redtenbacher, 1891)
 Conocephalus concolor (Burmeister, 1838)
 Conocephalus decaspinosus Nagar & Swaminathan, 2016
 Conocephalus denticercus (Karny, 1907)
 Conocephalus dorsalidentatus Li, Zhang & Shi, 2019
 Conocephalus dorsalis (Latreille, 1804)
 Conocephalus ebneri Harz, 1966
 Conocephalus equatorialis (Giglio-Tos, 1898)
 Conocephalus exemptus (Walker, 1869)
 Conocephalus exitiosus (McNeill, 1901)
 Conocephalus exsul (Karny, 1911)
 Conocephalus fasciatus (De Geer, 1773)
 Conocephalus flavus (Redtenbacher, 1891)
 Conocephalus formosus (Redtenbacher, 1891)
 Conocephalus fulmeki (Ebner, 1927)
 Conocephalus fuscus (Fabricius, 1793): disputed synonym C. discolor (Thunberg, 1815) - long-winged Conehead
 Conocephalus gigantius (Matsumura & Shiraki, 1908)
 Conocephalus goianus Piza, 1977
 Conocephalus gracilicercus Li & Shi, 2018
 Conocephalus gracillimus Morse, 1901
 Conocephalus guangdongensis Shi & Liang, 1997
 Conocephalus hainanensis Shi & Wang, 2015
 Conocephalus hastatus (Charpentier, 1825)
 Conocephalus hilli Farooqi & Usmani, 2019
 Conocephalus honorei (Bolívar, 1900)
 Conocephalus hygrophilus Rehn & Hebard, 1915
 Conocephalus ictus (Scudder, 1875)
 Conocephalus inconspicuus (Karny, 1920)
 Conocephalus infumatus (Redtenbacher, 1891)
 Conocephalus insularis (Morse, 1905)
 Conocephalus iriodes Rehn & Hebard, 1915
 Conocephalus iris (Serville, 1838)
 Conocephalus japonicus (Redtenbacher, 1891)
 Conocephalus kisi Harz, 1967
 Conocephalus kwasiphaiensis Nagar & Swaminathan, 2016
 Conocephalus liangi Liu & Zhang, 2007
 Conocephalus liebermanni Ebner, 1953
 Conocephalus longipennis (Haan, 1843)
 Conocephalus maculatus (Le Guillou, 1841)
 Conocephalus magdalenae Naskrecki, 2000
 Conocephalus meadowsae Harz, 1970
 Conocephalus melaenus (Haan, 1843)
 Conocephalus nanlingensis Li, Xin & Shi, 2019
 Conocephalus nemoralis (Scudder, 1875)
 Conocephalus nigropleuroides Fox, 1912
 Conocephalus nigropleurum (Bruner, 1891)
 Conocephalus occidentalis (Morse, 1901)
 Conocephalus oceanicus (Le Guillou, 1841)
 Conocephalus ochrotelus Rehn & Hebard, 1915
 Conocephalus percaudatus Bey-Bienko, 1955
 Conocephalus peringueyi Uvarov, 1928
 Conocephalus pictus (Redtenbacher, 1891)
 Conocephalus recticaudus Bruner, 1915
 Conocephalus redtenbacheri (Bolívar, 1905)
 Conocephalus rentzi Farooqi & Usmani, 2018
 Conocephalus resacensis Rehn & Hebard, 1915
 Conocephalus resinus (Saussure & Pictet, 1898)
 Conocephalus rhodesianus (Péringuey, 1916)
 Conocephalus saltator (Saussure, 1859)
 Conocephalus semivittatus (Walker, 1869)
 Conocephalus semraensis Farooqi & Usmani, 2021
 Conocephalus shanghaiensis Zhou, Bi & Liu, 2010
 Conocephalus signatus (Redtenbacher, 1891)
 Conocephalus spartinae (Fox, 1912)
 Conocephalus spinosus (Morse, 1901)
 Conocephalus starmuehlneri Kaltenbach, 1968
 Conocephalus strictus (Scudder, 1875)
 Conocephalus trifasciatus (Redtenbacher, 1891)
 Conocephalus trivittatus (Stål, 1861)
 Conocephalus truncatus (Redtenbacher, 1891)
 Conocephalus tumidus Pitkin, 1980
 Conocephalus tumultuosus Willemse, 1942
 Conocephalus unicolor Bruner, 1915
 Conocephalus versicolor (Redtenbacher, 1891)
 Conocephalus vestitus (Redtenbacher, 1891)
 Conocephalus willemsei Pitkin, 1980
 Conocephalus yunnanensis Shi & Feng, 2009

Conocephalus (Aphauropus)  
- subgenus: Rehn & Hebard, 1915 (central America)
 Conocephalus leptopterus Rehn & Hebard, 1915

Conocephalus (Chloroxiphidion)  
- subgenus: Hebard, 1922 (Africa, Australasia: probably incomplete)
 Conocephalus albescens (Walker, 1869)
 Conocephalus bituberculatus (Redtenbacher, 1891)
 Conocephalus dubius Willemse, 1942
 Conocephalus javanicus (Redtenbacher, 1891)
 Conocephalus laetus (Redtenbacher, 1891)
 Conocephalus striata Willemse, 1942
 Conocephalus upoluensis (Karny, 1907)
 Conocephalus vaginatus Willemse, 1942

Conocephalus (Conocephalus)  
- subgenus: Thunberg, 1815 (Worldwide)

 Conocephalus bambusanus Ingrisch, 1990 (synonym C. abispinatus Hsia & Liu, 1990)
 Conocephalus basutoanus Chopard, 1955
 Conocephalus bispinatus Pitkin, 1980
 Conocephalus brevivalvus (Shi, Wang & Fu, 2005)
 Conocephalus brincki Chopard, 1955
 Conocephalus conocephalus (Linnaeus, 1767)type species (as Gryllus conocephalus L.)
 Conocephalus differentus Shi & Liang, 1997
 Conocephalus emeiensis Shi & Zheng, 1999
 Conocephalus lugubris (Redtenbacher, 1891)
 Conocephalus obtectus Karny, 1907
 Conocephalus saltans (Scudder, 1872)
 Conocephalus somali (Burr, 1900)
 Conocephalus sulcifrontis Xia & Liu, 1992
 Conocephalus tridens Hebard, 1933
 Conocephalus xiai Liu & Zhang, 2007

Conocephalus (Dicellurina)  
- subgenus: Rehn & Hebard, 1938 (eastern USA)
 Conocephalus allardi (Caudell, 1910)

Conocephalus (Megalotheca) 
- subgenus: Karny, 1907 (southern Africa, Madagascar)
 Conocephalus longiceps (Péringuey, 1916)
 Conocephalus marcelloi Gorochov & Llorente del Moral, 2004
 Conocephalus montana (Uvarov, 1928)
 Conocephalus namibius Gorochov, 2009
 Conocephalus nigrifrons (Chopard, 1952)
 Conocephalus parvula (Péringuey, 1916)
 Conocephalus phasma Gorochov & Llorente del Moral, 2004
 Conocephalus vaginalis (Karny, 1907)
 Conocephalus xiphidioides (Karny, 1907)
 Conocephalus zlobini Gorochov, 2009

Conocephalus (Opeastylus)  
- subgenus: Rehn & Hebard, 1915 (southern America)
 Conocephalus longipes (Redtenbacher, 1891)
 Conocephalus vitticollis (Blanchard, 1851)

Conocephalus (Perissacanthus)   
- subgenus: Rehn & Hebard, 1915 (Paraguay)
 Conocephalus strictoides (Caudell, 1906)

subgenus not assigned 
 Conocephalus aculeatus Piza, 1969
 Conocephalus affinis Redtenbacher, 1891
 Conocephalus goianus Piza, 1977
 Conocephalus algerinorum Massa, 1999
 Conocephalus cinereus Thunberg, 1815
 Conocephalus differentus Shi & Liang, 1997
 Conocephalus emeiensis Shi & Zheng, 1999
 Conocephalus halophilus Ishikawa, 2004
 Conocephalus melaenoides Sänger & Helfert, 1995
 Conocephalus sojolensis Sänger & Helfert, 1995
 Conocephalus spinosus (Morse, 1901)
 Conocephalus stictomerus Rehn & Hebard, 1915

References

External links
 
 

 
Tettigoniidae genera